Valdemar Byskov Andreasen (born 25 January 2005) is a Danish professional footballer who plays as a attacking midfielder for Midtjylland.

Professional career
Andreasen is a youth product of Herning Fremad and Ikast, before joining Midtjylland at the age of 13. On 24 February 2020, he signed his first professional contract with Midtjylland. He worked his way up the latter's youth systems before being promoted to their reserves in 2022. He made his professional and senior debut with Midtjylland as a late substitute in a 5–1 Danish Cup win over Lazio on 15 September 2022.

International career
Andreasen is a youth international for Denmark, having played for the Denmark U18s.

References

External links
Profile at the FC Midtjylland website
 
 DBU Profile

2005 births
Living people
People from Herning Municipality
Danish men's footballers
Denmark youth international footballers
Association football midfielders
FC Midtjylland players
Danish Superliga players